Joseph Ortiz Blanco (born August 13, 1990) is a Venezuelan former professional baseball pitcher. He played in Major League Baseball (MLB) for one season in 2013 with the Texas Rangers.

Career

Texas Rangers
On August 28, 2006, Ortiz signed with the Texas Rangers as an international free agent. He made his professional debut in 2007 with the Dominican Summer League Rangers. In 2008, Ortiz split the season between the AZL Rangers and the Single-A Clinton LumberKings, posting a 1.91 ERA in 24 games. He split the 2009 season between the Low-A Spokane Indians and the Single-A Hickory Crawdads, pitching to a cumulative 3.38 ERA with 44 strikeouts in 42.2 innings of work. The following season, Ortiz split the year between Hickory and the High-A Bakersfield Blaze, where he recorded a 4-1 record and 1.62 ERA in 28 appearances. For the 2011 season, Ortiz played with the High-A Myrtle Beach Pelicans, logging a 5-5 record and 2.15 ERA with 55 strikeouts in 67.0 innings pitched. In 2012, Ortiz split the year between the Double-A Frisco RoughRiders and the Triple-A Round Rock Express, accumulating a 2-3 record and 2.15 ERA in 51 appearances between the two teams.

Ortiz made the Texas Rangers' Opening Day roster in 2013. He made his MLB debut on March 31, 2013, pitching 1 inning against the Houston Astros, striking out 2 and allowing 1 earned run. He split the 2013 season between Round Rock and Texas, recording a 2-2 record and 4.23 ERA in 32 big league games. Ortiz did not appear in a big league game in 2014, spending most of the season on the disabled list or with Frisco and the AZL Rangers.

Chicago Cubs
On October 6, 2014, Ortiz was claimed off waivers by the Chicago Cubs. He was assigned to the Triple-A Iowa Cubs to begin the 2015 season. Ortiz was released by the Cubs organization on August 14, 2015, after registering a 5.24 ERA in 38 games with Iowa.

Joliet Slammers
On February 20, 2017, Ortiz signed with the Joliet Slammers of the Frontier League. Ortiz pitched to a 4-3 record and 5.19 ERA in 19 games with Joliet before he was released by the team on August 12.

See also
 List of Major League Baseball players from Venezuela

References

External links

Joe Ortiz at Pura Pelota (Venezuelan Professional Baseball League)
Joe Ortiz at Rotoworld

1990 births
Living people
Arizona League Rangers players
Bakersfield Blaze players
Caribes de Anzoátegui players
Clinton LumberKings players
Dominican Summer League Rangers players
Venezuelan expatriate baseball players in the Dominican Republic
Frisco RoughRiders players
Hickory Crawdads players
Iowa Cubs players
Joliet Slammers players
Major League Baseball pitchers
Major League Baseball players from Venezuela
Myrtle Beach Pelicans players
Baseball players from Caracas
Round Rock Express players
Spokane Indians players
Texas Rangers players
Tiburones de La Guaira players
Venezuelan expatriate baseball players in the United States